Prodicynodon is an extinct genus of dicynodont from the Late Permian of South Africa. Two species are known, the type species P. pearstonensis and P. beaufortensis, both known only from their respective holotypes.

The holotypes of both Prodicynodon species are small, and some authors have considered Prodicynodon either a senior synonym of Chelydontops or a juvenile Endothiodon. However, in a 2014 abstract for the annual meeting of the Society of Vertebrate Paleontology, Christian Kammerer and colleagues considered Prodicynodon a valid genus closely related to Therochelonia based on CT scanning and unpublished phylogenetic results, even while agreeing with King (1988) that the Prodicynodon specimens were juvenile.

See also

 List of therapsids

References

 The main groups of non-mammalian synapsids at Mikko's Phylogeny Archive

Dicynodonts
Lopingian synapsids of Africa
Fossil taxa described in 1904
Taxa named by Robert Broom